Laka is a surname. Notable people with the surname include:

Don Laka (born 1958), South African jazz musician, songwriter, and music producer
Elvir Laković Laka (born 1969), Bosnian singer-songwriter
Roger Laka, Papua New Guinean rugby league player